Ranch to Market Road 1431 (RM 1431) is a  ranch to market road that connects Austin, Texas, to rural areas of Central Texas.

Route description
The western terminus of RM 1431 is in Llano County, at an intersection with SH 261 along the southwestern shore of Lake Buchanan. The roadway initially travels to the southwest, crossing SH 29, before turning to the south and into Kingsland. After crossing into Burnet County, RM 1431 takes a more southeasterly path through Granite Shoals and Marble Falls, where it crosses US 281. The highway continues east and roughly parallels Lake Travis to its south, crossing into Travis County and passing through the cities of Lago Vista and Jonestown. RM 1431 then enters Cedar Park in Williamson County, where it has intersections with US 183, the 183A Toll Road, and FM 734 (Parmer Lane). The route heads east into Round Rock, Texas, where it reaches its eastern terminus at Interstate 35's exit 256. The roadway continues into Round Rock as University Boulevard.

History
Farm to Market Road 1431 (FM 1431) was originally designated in Starr County on July 15, 1949, on a route from FM 755 eastward to La Reforma at the Hidalgo County line. That designation was canceled on November 30, 1949, and the route was combined with FM 1017.

The designation was changed to RM 1431 on October 1, 1956. The route was extended westward into Llano County and to SH 29 on November 21, 1956. It was extended eastward to Travis Peak Road on October 31, 1958, and further east to US 183 in White Stone (now part of Cedar Park) on November 26, 1958, replacing RM 1328. RM 1431 was extended to its current western terminus at SH 261 on September 5, 1973, and to its current eastern terminus at I-35 on June 21, 1978.

Officially, a  segment of the route along Whitestone Boulevard in Cedar Park was transferred to the jurisdiction of the city on January 28, 2010.

Business route

RM 1431 has one auxiliary route, Business Farm to Market Road 1431-J (Bus. FM 1431-J), designated along a former alignment of RM 1431 in Burnet County east of Marble Falls. The  business route was created in 2010 and serves the Waterford subdivision and golf club on Lake Travis. The route was created when RM 1431 was aligned along a more direct path from west to east bypassing the business route's more southerly dip. The business route intersects no other numbered state highways between its termini with RM 1431.

Major intersections

Notes

References

External links

1431
Transportation in Austin, Texas
Transportation in Llano County, Texas
Transportation in Burnet County, Texas
Transportation in Travis County, Texas
Transportation in Williamson County, Texas
Cedar Park, Texas